Geraldine Margaret Agnew-Somerville (born 19 May 1967) is an Irish actress. She is known for her roles in the film Gosford Park (2001) and the Harry Potter film series (2001–2011). Her other roles have included My Week with Marilyn (2011) and Grace of Monaco (2014). In 1995, Somerville was nominated for a BAFTA Award for playing Jane Penhaligon in the television series Cracker from 1993 to 1995.

Career
Somerville appeared on TV in episodes of Agatha Christie's Poirot and Casualty (1993) before landing the role of Penhaligon in Cracker, which she held from the show's inception in 1993 until its demise in 1995.

Somerville played Lady Stockbridge in  Gosford Park (2001) and Harry Potter's mother Lily in all the Potter movies. In May 2007, she played author Daphne du Maurier in the BBC TV drama Daphne. She played a leading role as fictional Louisa, Countess of Manton in the 2012 ITV mini-series Titanic.

In 2014, Somerville played Princess Antoinette of Monaco in the film Grace of Monaco. In 2014, she played Sarah Griffin in the BBC One mini-series Quirke.

Filmography

Video games

References

External links

Living people
1967 births
20th-century British actresses
21st-century British actresses
Actors from County Meath
Actresses from London
Alumni of the Guildhall School of Music and Drama
British film actresses
British people of Irish descent
British radio actresses
British Shakespearean actresses
British stage actresses
British television actresses
British voice actresses
Daughters of baronets
Manx people of Irish descent
Outstanding Performance by a Cast in a Motion Picture Screen Actors Guild Award winners
People educated at Tring Park School for the Performing Arts